Hudsonville Public Schools is the second largest school district in Ottawa County, Michigan, covering approximately 80 square miles.

It serves all of the City of Hudsonville and small portions of Allendale and Jenison. It also includes the majority of Jamestown Charter Township and portions of the following townships: Blendon, Georgetown, and Zeeland, as well as a small portion of Allendale Charter Township. The district is a part of the Ottawa Area Intermediate School District.

Facilities
Secondary Schools:
 Hudsonville High School (Grades 10-12)
 Hudsonville Freshman Campus (Grade 9)
 Baldwin Street Middle (Grades 6-8)
 Riley Street Middle (Grades 6-8)
Primary Schools (K-5):
 Alward Elementary
 Bauer Elementary
 Forest Grove Elementary
 Georgetown Elementary
 Jamestown Upper Elementary
 Jamestown Lower Elementary
 Park Elementary
 South Elementary
Other Schools:
 Early Childhood Center
Performing Arts Venues:
Hudsonville Fine Arts Auditorium - HHS Freshman Campus
Eagle Auditorium - HHS Main Campus

Awards
US Department of Education National Blue Ribbon School
2014 - Jamestown Elementary School
2015 - Forest Grove Elementary School
2016 - South Elementary School
Michigan Schools to Watch
2009 - Baldwin Street & Riley Street Middle Schools
2013 - Baldwin Street Middle School
2017 - Baldwin Street Middle School

References

External links 

 

School districts in Michigan
Education in Ottawa County, Michigan
1855 establishments in Michigan
School districts established in 1855